The Specials is a reality television series about five friends with intellectual disabilities who share a house in Brighton, UK.

Originally made as a web-series the show has since made the transition to television.

The five housemates, Sam, Hilly, Lewis, Megan and Lucy, have been friends since childhood. Aged between 19 and 23, one person, Lewis, has Williams syndrome while the others have Down syndrome. The series was launched on its website on 2 September 2009 and ran until mid-November 2009 with weekly 10-minute episodes.

Created by producer/director Katy Lock and Daniel May, the series follows the independent living venture that arose when 20-year-old Hilly told her parents she wanted to live with her friends. Hilly's parents, Carol and Dafydd Williams, set up Small Opportunities, the company which runs the house where the housemates in The Specials live.

The observational documentary series follows their lives and has been granted positive reviews for the insight it gives into inclusive, independent living for adults with intellectual disabilities. It was used in a Disability Studies course that focuses on media and disability at City University of New York in summer 2011.

The series is ground-breaking and empowers young adults with intellectual disabilities tell the audience about their lives through the narration in the series. Reviewers have compared it to MTV's The Real World, saying "inner-house romance and friendship rule, minus the evil."

Web series
The show was initially launched as a web-series on The Specials website. Consisting of ten 10–15 minute episodes, the first episode was released on 2 September 2009. Subsequent episodes were released roughly every fortnight, with the 10th and last released on 7 December 2009.

The web series begins when the housemates are aged between 19 and 23 at the point where Megan moves into the house. During the course of the show, the housemates attend to their daily activities, like life skills classes, preparing meals, and working in a charity shop, as well as going on holiday, learning to surf, and competing in a Special Olympics equestrian event.

Awards
 Winner, Webby Award in the Reality Category, 14th Annual Webby Awards 2010.
 Winner, People's Choice Award in the Reality Category, 14th Annual Webby Awards 2010.
 Winner, Festival Cinema Tous Ecrans 'Prix Titra Films S.A.,' November 2010.
 Winner, Best Web Series, National Youth Disability Film Awards UK, December 2010.
 Finalist, Original Series category, Vimeo Awards 2010.

Transition to television
The show's creators Katy Lock and Daniel May were contacted by Carolyn Strauss (executive producer of "Game of Thrones" and former president of HBO Entertainment). She had been introduced to the web series by D. B. Weiss (co-creator of "Game of Thrones"). Together, and with the help of Rosie O'Donnell they brought it to executives at OWN, including Oprah Winfrey. OWN acquired two seasons of the show.

Season 1
Season 1 consists of the web series with some extra footage recut into six 21-minute episodes. It launched together with season 2 on OWN as a back-to-back marathon on 7 September 2014.

Season 2
Season 2 consists of seven 21-minute episodes. It premiered together with season 1 on OWN as a back-to-back marathon on 7 September 2014. It picks up 2 years after the end of season 1.

References

External links
 "The Specials" Official Website
 "The Specials" YouTube channel
 "The Specials" Dailymotion channel
 Mencap: UK organization for people with intellectual disabilities and their families.
 UK Down Syndrome Association
 UK Williams Syndrome Foundation
 Article in UK TV industry magazine Broadcast Now, August 27, 2009
 "Docusoap with a difference," podcast of The Specials' interview on BBC Radio 4's "You and Yours"
 Feature on BBC South East Today 18:30 television news, September 4, 2009
 "13 Questions: Lewis from The Specials," BBC's disability website Ouch!, October 22, 2009
 BBC South follows 'The Specials' to pick up their Webby Award in New York
 ITV Meridian meets 'The Specials' as they are about to launch their new web series
  Influencers Radio Interview with Creators Katy Lock and Daniel - August 29, 2014
  CNN iReport - September 1, 2014

Reality web series
Down syndrome in television
2009 British television series debuts